Fribourg/Freiburg Poya railway station is a railway station in the municipality of Fribourg, in the Swiss canton of Fribourg. It is an intermediate stop on the standard gauge Lausanne–Bern line of Swiss Federal Railways. The station opened at the end of 2014 and is adjacent to BCF Arena, home of the HC Fribourg-Gottéron professional ice hockey team.

Services 
The following services stop at Fribourg/Freiburg Poya:

References

External links 
 
 

Railway stations in Switzerland opened in 2014
Railway stations in the canton of Fribourg
Swiss Federal Railways stations
Transport in Fribourg